Ten-codes, officially known as ten signals, are brevity codes used to represent common phrases in voice communication, particularly by law enforcement and in Citizens Band (CB) radio transmissions. The police version of ten-codes is officially known as the APCO Project 14 Aural Brevity Code.

The codes, developed during 1937–1940 and expanded in 1974 by the Association of Public-Safety Communications Officials-International (APCO), allow brevity and standardization of message traffic.  They have historically been widely used by law enforcement officers in North America, but – due to the lack of standardization – in 2006, the U.S. federal government recommended they be discontinued in favor of everyday language.

History
APCO first proposed Morse code brevity codes in the June 1935 issue of The APCO Bulletin, which were adapted from the procedure symbols of the U.S. Navy, though these procedures were for communications in Morse code, not voice.

In August 1935, the APCO Bulletin published a recommendation that the organization issue a handbook that described standard operating procedures, including:
 A standard message form for use by all police departments.
 A simple code for service dispatches relating to corrections, repetitions, etc.
 A standard arrangement of the context of messages, (for example, name and description of missing person might be transmitted as follows: Name, age, height, weight, physical characteristics, clothing; if car used, the license, make, description and motor number. This information would actually be transmitted in the text of the message as follows: John Brown 28-5-9-165 medium build brown eyes dark hair dark suit light hat Mich. 35 lic. W 2605 Ford S 35 blue red wheels 2345678 may go to Indiana).
 A standard record system for logging the operation of the station.
 Other important records in accordance with the uniform crime reporting system sponsored by the International Association of Chiefs of Police.
The development of the APCO Ten Signals began in 1937 to reduce use of speech on the radio at a time when police radio channels were limited. Credit for inventing the codes goes to Charles "Charlie" Hopper, communications director for the Illinois State Police, District 10 in Pesotum, Illinois. Hopper had been involved in radio for years and realized there was a need to abbreviate transmissions on State Police bands. Experienced radio operators knew the first syllable of a transmission was frequently not understood because of quirks in early electronics technology. Radios in the 1930s were based on vacuum tubes powered by a small motor-generator called a dynamotor. The dynamotor took from 1/10 to 1/4 of a second to "spin up" to full power. Police officers were trained to push the microphone button, then pause briefly before speaking; however, sometimes they would forget to wait. Preceding each code with "ten-" gave the radio transmitter time to reach full power. An APCO Bulletin of January 1940 lists codes assigned as part of standardisation.

In 1954, APCO published an article describing a proposed simplification of the code, based on an analysis conducted by the San Diego Police Department. In the September 1955 issue of the APCO Bulletin, a revision of the Ten-Signals was proposed, and it was later adopted.

The Ten Signals were included in APCO Project Two (1967), "Public Safety Standard Operating Procedures Manual", published as study cards in APCO Project 4 (1973), "Ten Signal Cards", and then revised in APCO Project 14 (1974).

In popular culture
Ten-codes, especially "10-4" (meaning "understood") first reached public recognition in the mid- to late-1950s through the popular television series Highway Patrol, with Broderick Crawford. Crawford would reach into his patrol car to use the microphone to answer a call and precede his response with "10-4".

Ten-codes were adapted for use by CB radio enthusiasts. C. W. McCall's hit song "Convoy" (1975), depicting conversation among CB-communicating truckers, put phrases like "10-4" and "what's your twenty?" (10-20 for "where are you?") into common use in American English.

The movie Convoy (1978), loosely based on McCall's song, further entrenched ten-codes in casual conversation.

The ten-codes used by the New York Police Department have returned to public attention thanks to the popularity of the television series Blue Bloods. However, the ten-codes used by the NYPD are not the same as those used in the APCO system. For example, in the NYPD system, Code 10-13 means "Officer needs help," whereas in the APCO system "Officer needs help" is Code 10-33.

The New Zealand reality television show Ten 7 Aotearoa (formerly Police Ten 7) takes its name from the New Zealand Police ten-code 10-7, which means "Unit has arrived at job".

The syndicated internet radio countdown program "What's your Twenty" is named after the code for location.

Police officer retirement
Often when an officer retires, a call to dispatch is made. The officer gives a 10-7 code (Out of service) and then a 10-42 code (ending tour of duty).

Signals by era

Replacement with plain language 
While ten-codes were intended to be a terse, concise, and standardized system, the proliferation of different meanings can render them useless in situations when officers from different agencies and jurisdictions need to communicate.

In the fall of 2005, responding to inter-organizational communication problems during the rescue operations after Hurricane Katrina, the United States Federal Emergency Management Agency (FEMA) discouraged the use of ten-codes and other codes due to their wide variation in meaning. The Department of Homeland Security's SAFECOM program, established in response to communication problems experienced during the September 11 attacks also advises local agencies on how and why to transition to plain language, and their use is expressly forbidden in the nationally standardized Incident Command System, as is the use of other codes.

APCO International stated in 2012 that plain speech communications over public safety radio systems is preferred over the traditional 10-Codes and dispatch signals. Nineteen states had changed to plain English by the end of 2009. , ten-codes remained in common use in many areas, but were increasingly being phased out in favor of plain language.

Clear Speech Procedure 
In 1971, the Public Safety Department of Lakewood, Colorado published a study comparing the APCO Ten-code with the proposed Clear Speech procedure. The study used standards for judgment of both communications procedures based on The Public Safety Communications Standard Operating Procedure Manual, 1970 edition, published  by APCO.

 RogerTo be used as acknowledgement.
 AFFIRMATIVETo be used when "yes" is needed
 HELPTo be used when in danger and urgent assistance is needed.

Phrase Word Brevity Code 
About 1979, APCO created the Phrase Word Brevity Code as a direct replacement for the Ten-code.

ICS Clear Text 
In 1980, the National Incident Management System published a document, ICS Clear Text Guide, which was another attempt to create a replacement for Ten-codes. The list of code words was republished in the 1990 Montana Mutual Aid and Common Frequencies document.

Related codes

Brevity codes other than the APCO 10-code are frequently used, and include several types:

The California Highway Patrol uses ten-codes, along with an additional set of eleven- and higher codes.
California Penal Code sections were in use by the Los Angeles Police Department as early as the 1940s, and these Hundred Code numbers are still used today instead of the corresponding ten-code.  Generally these are given as two sets of numbers—"One Eighty-Seven" or "Fifty-One Fifty"—with a few exceptions such as "459"—Burglary, which is given as "Four-Five-Nine". The American public was made aware of these California Penal Code references as a result of the TV series Adam-12, which used them habitually in radio communications and in the main title of the show. The best-known include:
 "187": Homicide 
 "211": Robbery
 "415": Disturbance
 "417": Person with a weapon
 "502": Intoxicated Driver
 "5150": Mentally disturbed person (actually a reference to the California Welfare and Institutions Code)
The New York Fire Department uses its own ten-code system.
The New Zealand Fire Service uses a system of "K-codes" to pass fire appliance availability statuses as well as operational messages. For example, "K1" means "proceeding to incident", while "K99" means "Structure fire, well involved". The New Zealand Police also use some K-codes, with completely unrelated meanings to those used by NZFS; Police code "K1" means "no further police action required".
Telegraph and teletype procedures
Q code and prosigns for Morse code are used in amateur radio, aviation, and marine radio. They provide specific abbreviations for concepts related to aviation, shipping, RTTY, radiotelegraph, and amateur radio. In radiotelegraph operation, a Q code is often shorter, and provides codes standardized by meaning in all languages – essential for international shortwave radio communications.
Z codes are used for military radio communications NATO countries, and like Q codes are standardized across languages.

See also
Advanced Medical Priority Dispatch System
Emergency service response codes
Law enforcement jargon
List of CB slang
List of international common standards
Medical Priority Dispatch System
NATO phonetic alphabet
Radiotelephony procedure
Procedure word
Spelling alphabet

References

External links
 The APCO Bulletin, January 1940 – The first official publication showing the 10-codes.
 Official Ten-Code List Association of Public Communications Officers (APCO)

Brevity codes
Emergency communication
Encodings
Law enforcement in the United States
Telegraphy
Telecommunications-related introductions in 1937